Marín is a town and municipality in Galicia, Spain in the province of Pontevedra. This town is where the Spanish Navy was settled. It was established as the Escuela Naval Militar de Oficiales (Naval Academy for Officers). It is located on the southern shore of the estuary of Pontevedra, in the comarca of O Morrazo.

Formerly named San Xiao Ancorados by ships anchored nearby, but it is a popular distortion of "Encoirados," meaning leather tanneries, as they were in the Lameira river which flows into the urban center of the village. Father Sarmiento says his name comes from the Latin word mare, meaning sea, but it is now known to be derived from the name of a former possessor of this land named Marinus. Marín derives from Marini, "property of Marinus." Both references to the sea are, therefore, pure coincidences.

Demographics
Population growth.

2018: 24,362
2007: 25,885
2006: 26.190
2005: 26.103
2003: 24.825

Immigration to Marin

As of 2006, the migrant group is 3.49% of the total municipality population. 32% are from the same province of Galicia, the second are foreign-born groups at 30%. 35.9% of the foreign born population are from South America. Then sub-Saharan Africa (mainly from Ghana, then Sierra Leone and Nigeria). In the central Urban population foreign-born populations constitute 9.07% of the total in 2006.

Signs of identity
Marín is home to the Naval Academy, the only facility of its kind in Spain, which was moved from San Fernando (Cádiz) in 1943. The King of Spain, or the Prince of Asturias (both studied at the Naval Academy), visit the school each Day of Carmen (July 16) to preside over the ceremony of the Pledge of Allegiance and Delivery Offices. With the abolition of compulsory military service in 1996, under then Prime Minister Jose Maria Aznar, the use of these facilities compared to previous years at that time is much inferior.

Its beaches receive thousands of visitors each year and are the main attraction of the municipality. The main beaches are Portocelo, Mogor, Aguete, Loire, O Santo and Lapamán. In 2006, the beaches of Portocelo, Mogor, Aguete and Loire were added as Blue Flag beaches and in 2007.

Marín is also home to the Palace of Cadro oldest pazo (fortress) in Galicia and the family seat of the House of Romay.

Sports
Since 2013, the town's professional basketball team CB Peixefresco plays in the LEB Oro.

See also 
 :Category:People from Marín, Pontevedra
 Ferrol Spanish Capital of the Maritime Department of the North (1788 AD).
 Spanish Naval Academy (ENM) In modern times, Institution where the Spanish Armada officers and other personnel receive their education.
 "El Galatea" (also known as Glenlee) From 1922 till 1969 it was the Training Tall Ship for the Spanish Navy in Ferrol (Northwestern Spain).
 "El Juan Sebastián Elcano" Currently, Training Tall Ship for the Spanish Navy in the Escuela Naval Militar de Oficiales de Marín.
 Structure of the Spanish Navy in the 21st century

References

External links
Website about the Escuela Naval Militar

Municipalities in the Province of Pontevedra